Stephanie Oursler is a United States visual artist and political activist born on June 21, 1938, in Baltimore, Maryland. She graduated from literature at George Washington University where she taught for a while. First Director of the Women Center in New York in 1969, National Secretary of the Peace and Freedom Party, candidate 1965-67 and Black Panther activist in 1966-67 . She moved to Italy after having met Vana Caruso, an assistant director, married to the Italian artist Giulio Turcato. In Italy she took part to the feminist group "La Compagnia del Beato Angelico". Active as an artist in 1970s in Italy, she had exhibitions in the Art Gallery of Romana Loda, "Multimedia" at Erbusco. "Happy New Year", in 1975. The artist's book  "Un album di violenza", Edizioni delle donne, was published a year later. She had several exhibition in Italy and published many artist's books in the 70s.

Further reading

References 

1938 births
Living people
American expatriates in Italy
People from Baltimore
Activists from Maryland